NJO or njo or variation, may refer to:

NJO
NJO may refer to:

National Youth Orchestra of the Netherlands
New Jazz Orchestra, British jazz big band active from 1963 to 1970
The New Jedi Order, a series of Star Wars novels published from 1999 to 2003

Njo
Njo or njo, may refer to:

ISO 639:njo (Mongsen Ao language), Sino-Tibetan language spoken in Nagaland, India
Yang (surname), in the Indonesian spelling of one of its Hokkien pronunciations
Njo, Cameroon; a village that was merged into Douala
Eugène N'Jo Léa (1931-2006) Cameroonian soccer player

See also

 Njøs (surname)
 
 
 
 NOJ (disambiguation)
 JNO
 Jon (disambiguation)
 ONJ (disambiguation)
 OJN